Alena Douhan of Belarus is the United Nations Special Rapporteur on the negative impact of the unilateral coercive measures on the enjoyment of human rights, as 25 March 2020. When appointed, she was a professor of International Law at the Belarusian State University and the Director of the Peace Research Center.

Douhan earned a PhD at the Belarusian State University in 2005 and a Dr. hab. in International Law and European Law in 2015 .

Special Rapporteur
According to the National Review, the role of Special Rapporteur was created by a 2014 resolution at the U.N. Human Rights Council introduced by Iran on behalf of the non-aligned movement, and Douhan is the second to occupy the role. The role is unpaid and its holder is not a member of the UN staff. In May 2022, Hong Kong Free Press reported that, in 2021, Douhan received a $200,000 contribution from the Chinese government, $150,000 from Russia, and $25,000 from Qatar.

Qatar
Douhan was in Qatar for twelve days in November 2020 to assess the impact of sanctions imposed by neighbouring countries. She was due to report at the 48th session of the UN Human Rights Council, to be held in September 2021. In a preliminary statement, she urged the lifting of sanctions.

Syria
In December 2020, Douhan asked the U.S. to lift its sanctions against Syria, saying they "may inhibit rebuilding of Syria’s civilian infrastructure” destroyed by the conflict, and may “violate the human rights of the Syrian people”. Her comments were welcomed by the Syrian government, and rejected by the US Special Envoy for Syria. In November 2022, Douhan visited Syria and again called on the U.S., the European Union and some Arab states to lift their sanctions, which, she said, were having a large negative effect "across all walks of life in the country" and were "leading to shortages in medicines and medical equipment that affect the lives of ordinary Syrians".

Venezuela
Douhan was due to visit Venezuela in August 2020 to investigate the impact of international sanctions. Before her visit, 66 Venezuelan NGOs (including PROVEA) asked Douhan in an open letter to consider the harmful impact of sanctions in the context of years of repression, corruption and economic mismanagement that predate the sanctions, and requested she meet independent press and civil society researchers.

She arrived on 31 January, and was welcomed on arrival by a government minister and the Venezuelan ambassador to the UN. She declared on her preliminary findings as she left on 12 February: that sanctions against Venezuela have had a noticeable negative impact on both the economy and the population. In her report, Douhan said that the economic pressure imposed by the US, the EU and other countries worsened economic and humanitarian situation in the country, but that Venezuela's economic decline "began in 2014 with the fall in oil prices" and that "mismanagement and corruption had also contributed." The government welcomed the report, while the opposition accused her of "playing into the hands of the regime" of Nicolás Maduro. Douhan was harshly criticized by the Venezuelan civil society, and several non-governmental organizations pronounced themselves in social media with the hashtag "#Lacrisisfueprimero" (The crisis came first).

Publications
 Douhan, A. F. (2017) The Ukrainian Crisis: Wrong Responses of the International Community? in 
 Douhan, A. F. (2018). Fundamental human rights and coercive measures: impact and interdependence. Journal of the Belarusian State University. International Relations, 1, 67-77. Retrieved from https://journals.bsu.by/index.php/internationalRelations/article/view/1307
 Douhan, Alena F. (2020) "CHANGING NATURE OF AN INDIVIDUAL IN INTERNATIONAL LAW." Kutafin University Law Review, vol. 5, no. 2, 2018, p. 290+. Accessed 10 June 2020.

References

United Nations special rapporteurs
Belarusian State University alumni
Academic staff of Belarusian State University
Year of birth missing (living people)
Living people
International law scholars